
Edward L. Allen or E. L. Allen (1830–1914) was a photographer in the 19th-century United States. He kept a studio on Temple Place in Boston, Massachusetts (c. 1868–1871). For some years he worked in partnership with Frank Rowell (as "Allen & Rowell"). Examples of Allen's photographs reside in the Boston Public Library and the Boston Athenaeum.

Image gallery

References

External links

 Flickr. Photo by Allen, 24 Temple Place, Boston
 Flickr. Verso of carte-de-visite by Allen
  (includes info related to Allen)

1830 births
1914 deaths
Photographers from Massachusetts
Artists from Boston
19th century in Boston
19th-century American photographers
Place of birth missing